Bodil Ryste (born 26 July 1979) is a Norwegian ski mountaineer and cross-country skier.

Ryste was born in Ørsta. She lives in Gaular-Bygstad.

Cross-country skiing results
All results are sourced from the International Ski Federation (FIS).

World Cup

Season standings

Ski mountaineering results
 2007:
 5th, European Championship relay race (together with Ellen Blom and Lene Pedersen)
 9th, European Championship team race (together with Marit Tveite Bystøl)
 2008:
 4th, World Championship relay race (together with Lene Pedersen, Ellen Blom and Marit Tveite Bystøl)
 2009:
 5th, European Championship relay race (together with Marit Tveite Bystøl and Oddrun Brakstad Orset)
 6th, European Championship team race (together with Marit Tveite Bystøl)
 9th, European Championship combination ranking

External links 
 Bodil Ryste at Skimountaineering.org

References 

1979 births
Living people
Norwegian female ski mountaineers
Norwegian female cross-country skiers
People from Ørsta
Sportspeople from Møre og Romsdal